The Amstel is a river in North Holland, the Netherlands.

Amstel may also refer to:
Amstel Brewery, a Dutch beer brewery
Amstel Gold Race, a road bicycle race
Amstel House, New Castle, Delaware, US
Amstel Playwright of the Year Award, a South African award, discontinued in 1994
Amstel Tijgers, an ice hockey team from Amsterdam
Amsterdam Airlines (ATC radio callsign "Amstel")
Amsterdam Amstel railway station, also a metro station
Van Amstel, a medieval dynasty which held the lordship of the area around the Amstel river
Jan van Amstel class minesweeper, a class of nine minesweepers of the Royal Netherlands Navy
HNLMS Jan van Amstel (1937)
 Nieuw-Amstel ("New Amstel"), the former name of New Castle, Delaware during the 17th century when it was a Dutch colony